Abraham (originally Abram) is the common Hebrew patriarch of the Abrahamic religions, including Judaism, Christianity, and Islam. In Judaism, he is the founding father of the special relationship between the Jews and God; in Christianity, he is the spiritual progenitor of all believers, whether Jewish or non-Jewish; and in Islam, he is a link in the chain of Islamic prophets that begins with Adam (see Adam in Islam) and culminates in Muhammad.

The story of the life of Abraham as told in the narrative of the Book of Genesis revolves around the themes of posterity and land. He is said to have been called by God to leave the house of his father Terah and settle in the land of Canaan, which God now promises to Abraham and his progeny. This promise is subsequently inherited by Isaac, Abraham's son by his wife Sarah, while Isaac's half-brother Ishmael is also promised that he will be the founder of a great nation. Abraham purchases a tomb (the Cave of the Patriarchs) at Hebron to be Sarah's grave, thus establishing his right to the land; and, in the second generation, his heir Isaac is married to a woman from his own kin, thus ruling the Canaanites out of any inheritance. Abraham later marries Keturah and has six more sons; but, on his death, when he is buried beside Sarah, it is Isaac who receives "all Abraham's goods" while the other sons receive only "gifts".

Most historians view the patriarchal age, along with the Exodus and the period of the biblical judges, as a late literary construct that does not relate to any particular historical era; and after a century of exhaustive archaeological investigation, no evidence has been found for a historical Abraham. It is largely concluded that the Torah was composed during the early Persian period (late-6th century BCE) as a result of tensions between Jewish landowners who had stayed in Judah during the Babylonian captivity and traced their right to the land through their "father Abraham", and the returning exiles who based their counterclaim on Moses and the Exodus tradition of the Israelites.

The Abraham cycle

Structure and narrative programs
The Abraham cycle is not structured by a unified plot centred on a conflict and its resolution or a problem and its solution. The episodes are often only loosely linked, and the sequence is not always logical, but it is unified by the presence of Abraham himself, as either actor or witness, and by the themes of posterity and land. These themes form "narrative programs" set out in Genesis 11:27-31 concerning the sterility of Sarah and 12:1-3 in which Abraham is ordered to leave the land of his birth for the land YHWH will show him.

Origins and calling
Terah, the ninth in descent from Noah, was the father of Abram, Nahor, and Haran ( Hārān). Haran was the father of Lot, who was Abram's nephew; the entire family lived in Ur of the Chaldees. Haran died in his native city, Ur of the Chaldees. Abram married Sarah (Sarai), who was barren. Terah, Abram, Sarai, and Lot departed for Canaan, but settled in a place named Haran ( Ḥārān), where Terah died at the age of 205. God had told Abram to leave his country and kindred and go to a land that he would show him, and promised to make of him a great nation, bless him, make his name great, bless them that bless him, and curse them who may curse him. Abram was 75 years old when he left Haran with his wife Sarai, his nephew Lot, and the substance and souls that they had acquired, and traveled to Shechem in Canaan.
Then he pitched his tent in the east of Bethel, and built an altar which was between Bethel and Ai.

Sarai
There was a severe famine in the land of Canaan, so that Abram and Lot and their households traveled to Egypt. On the way Abram told Sarai to say that she was his sister, so that the Egyptians would not kill him. When they entered Egypt, the Pharaoh's officials praised Sarai's beauty to Pharaoh, and they took her into the palace and gave Abram goods in exchange. God afflicted Pharaoh and his household with plagues, which led Pharaoh to try to find out what was wrong. Upon discovering that Sarai was a married woman, Pharaoh demanded that Abram and Sarai leave.

Abram and Lot separate

When they  lived for a while in the Negev after being banished from Egypt  and came back to the Bethel and Ai area, Abram's and Lot's sizable herds occupied the same pastures. This became a problem for the herdsmen, who were assigned to each family's cattle. The conflicts between herdsmen had become so troublesome that Abram suggested that Lot choose a separate area, either on the left hand or on the right hand, that there be no conflict amongst brethren. Lot decided to go eastward to the plain of Jordan, where the land was well watered everywhere as far as Zoar, and he dwelled in the cities of the plain toward Sodom. Abram went south to Hebron and settled in the plain of Mamre, where he built another altar to worship God.

Chedorlaomer

During the rebellion of the Jordan River cities, Sodom and Gomorrah, against Elam, Abram's nephew, Lot, was taken prisoner along with his entire household by the invading Elamite forces. The Elamite army came to collect the spoils of war, after having just defeated the king of Sodom's armies. Lot and his family, at the time, were settled on the outskirts of the Kingdom of Sodom which made them a visible target.

One person who escaped capture came and told Abram what happened. Once Abram received this news, he immediately assembled 318 trained servants. Abram's force headed north in pursuit of the Elamite army, who were already worn down from the Battle of Siddim. When they caught up with them at Dan, Abram devised a battle plan by splitting his group into more than one unit, and launched a night raid. Not only were they able to free the captives, Abram's unit chased and slaughtered the Elamite King Chedorlaomer at Hobah, just north of Damascus. They freed Lot, as well as his household and possessions, and recovered all of the goods from Sodom that had been taken.

Upon Abram's return, Sodom's king came out to meet with him in the Valley of Shaveh, the "king's dale". Also, Melchizedek king of Salem (Jerusalem), a priest of El Elyon, brought out bread and wine and blessed Abram and God. Abram then gave Melchizedek a tenth of everything. The king of Sodom then offered to let Abram keep all the possessions if he would merely return his people. Abram refused any deal from the king of Sodom, other than the share to which his allies were entitled.

Covenant of the pieces

The voice of the Lord came to Abram in a vision and repeated the promise of the land and descendants as numerous as the stars. Abram and God made a covenant ceremony, and God told of the future bondage of Israel in Egypt. God described to Abram the land that his offspring would claim: the land of the Kenites, Kenizzites, Kadmonites, Hittites, Perizzites, Rephaims, Amorites, Canaanites, Girgashites, and Jebusites.

Hagar

Abram and Sarai tried to make sense of how he would become a progenitor of nations, because after 10 years of living in Canaan, no child had been born. Sarai then offered her Egyptian slave, Hagar, to Abram with the intention that she would bear him a son.

After Hagar found she was pregnant, she began to despise her mistress, Sarai. Sarai responded by mistreating Hagar, and Hagar fled into the wilderness. An angel spoke with Hagar at the fountain on the way to Shur. He instructed her to return to Abram's camp and that her son would be "a wild ass of a man; his hand shall be against every man, and every man's hand against him; and he shall dwell in the face of all his brethren." She was told to call her son Ishmael. Hagar then called God who spoke to her "El-roi", ("Thou God seest me:" KJV). From that day onward, the well was called Beer-lahai-roi, ("The well of him that liveth and seeth me." KJV margin), located between Kadesh and Bered. She then did as she was instructed by returning to her mistress in order to have her child. Abram was 86 years of age when Ishmael was born.

Sarah
Thirteen years later, when Abram was 99 years of age, God declared Abram's new name: "Abraham" – "a father of many nations". Abraham then received the instructions for the covenant of the pieces, of which circumcision was to be the sign.

God declared Sarai's new name: "Sarah", blessed her, and told Abraham, "I will give thee a son also of her". Abraham laughed, and "said in his heart, 'Shall a child be born unto him that is a hundred years old? and shall Sarah, that is ninety years old, bear [a child]?'" Immediately after Abraham's encounter with God, he had his entire household of men, including himself (age 99) and Ishmael (age 13), circumcised.

Three visitors

Not long afterward, during the heat of the day, Abraham had been sitting at the entrance of his tent by the terebinths of Mamre. He looked up and saw three men in the presence of God. Then he ran and bowed to the ground to welcome them. Abraham then offered to wash their feet and fetch them a morsel of bread, to which they assented. Abraham rushed to Sarah's tent to order ash cakes made from choice flour, then he ordered a servant-boy to prepare a choice calf. When all was prepared, he set curds, milk and the calf before them, waiting on them, under a tree, as they ate.

One of the visitors told Abraham that upon his return next year, Sarah would have a son. While at the tent entrance, Sarah overheard what was said and she laughed to herself about the prospect of having a child at their ages. The visitor inquired of Abraham why Sarah laughed at bearing a child at her age, as nothing is too hard for God. Frightened, Sarah denied laughing.

Abraham's plea

After eating, Abraham and the three visitors got up. They walked over to the peak that overlooked the 'cities of the plain' to discuss the fate of Sodom and Gomorrah for their detestable sins that were so great, it moved God to action. Because Abraham's nephew was living in Sodom, God revealed plans to confirm and judge these cities. At this point, the two other visitors left for Sodom. Then Abraham turned to God and pleaded decrementally with Him (from fifty persons to less) that "if there were at least ten righteous men found in the city, would not God spare the city?" For the sake of ten righteous people, God declared that he would not destroy the city.

When the two visitors arrived in Sodom to conduct their report, they planned on staying in the city square. However, Abraham's nephew, Lot, met with them and strongly insisted that these two "men" stay at his house for the night. A rally of men stood outside of Lot's home and demanded that Lot bring out his guests so that they may "know" ( 5) them. However, Lot objected and offered his virgin daughters who had not "known" (v. 8) man to the rally of men instead. They rejected that notion and sought to break down Lot's door to get to his male guests, thus confirming the wickedness of the city and portending their imminent destruction.

Early the next morning, Abraham went to the place where he stood before God. He "looked out toward Sodom and Gomorrah" and saw what became of the cities of the plain, where not even "ten righteous" (v. 18:32) had been found, as "the smoke of the land went up as the smoke of a furnace."

Abimelech

Abraham settled between Kadesh and Shur in what the Bible anachronistically calls "the land of the Philistines". While he was living in Gerar, Abraham openly claimed that Sarah was his sister. Upon discovering this news, King Abimelech had her brought to him. God then came to Abimelech in a dream and declared that taking her would result in death because she was a man's wife. Abimelech had not laid hands on her, so he inquired if he would also slay a righteous nation, especially since Abraham had claimed that he and Sarah were siblings. In response, God told Abimelech that he did indeed have a blameless heart and that is why he continued to exist. However, should he not return the wife of Abraham back to him, God would surely destroy Abimelech and his entire household. Abimelech was informed that Abraham was a prophet who would pray for him.

Early next morning, Abimelech informed his servants of his dream and approached Abraham inquiring as to why he had brought such great guilt upon his kingdom. Abraham stated that he thought there was no fear of God in that place, and that they might kill him for his wife. Then Abraham defended what he had said as not being a lie at all: "And yet indeed she is my sister; she is the daughter of my father, but not the daughter of my mother; and she became my wife." Abimelech returned Sarah to Abraham, and gave him gifts of sheep, oxen, and servants; and invited him to settle wherever he pleased in Abimelech's lands. Further, Abimelech gave Abraham a thousand pieces of silver to serve as Sarah's vindication before all. Abraham then prayed for Abimelech and his household, since God had stricken the women with infertility because of the taking of Sarah.

After living for some time in the land of the Philistines, Abimelech and Phicol, the chief of his troops, approached Abraham because of a dispute that resulted in a violent confrontation at a well. Abraham then reproached Abimelech due to his Philistine servant's aggressive attacks and the seizing of Abraham's well. Abimelech claimed ignorance of the incident. Then Abraham offered a pact by providing sheep and oxen to Abimelech. Further, to attest that Abraham was the one who dug the well, he also gave Abimelech seven ewes for proof. Because of this sworn oath, they called the place of this well: Beersheba.

Isaac
As had been prophesied in Mamre the previous year, Sarah became pregnant and bore a son to Abraham, on the first anniversary of the covenant of circumcision. Abraham was "an hundred years old", when his son whom he named Isaac was born; and he circumcised him when he was eight days old. For Sarah, the thought of giving birth and nursing a child, at such an old age, also brought her much laughter, as she declared, "God hath made me to laugh, so that all who hear will laugh with me." Isaac continued to grow and on the day he was weaned, Abraham held a great feast to honor the occasion. During the celebration, however, Sarah found Ishmael mocking; an observation that would begin to clarify the birthright of Isaac.

Ishmael

Ishmael was fourteen years old when Abraham's son Isaac was born to Sarah. When she found Ishmael teasing Isaac, Sarah told Abraham to send both Ishmael and Hagar away. She declared that Ishmael would not share in Isaac's inheritance. Abraham was greatly distressed by his wife's words and sought the advice of his God. God told Abraham not to be distressed but to do as his wife commanded. God reassured Abraham that "in Isaac shall seed be called to thee." He also said that Ishmael would make a nation, "because he is thy seed".

Early the next morning, Abraham brought Hagar and Ishmael out together. He gave her bread and water and sent them away. The two wandered in the wilderness of Beersheba until her bottle of water was completely consumed. In a moment of despair, she burst into tears. After God heard the boy's voice, an angel of the Lord confirmed to Hagar that he would become a great nation, and will be "living on his sword". A well of water then appeared so that it saved their lives. As the boy grew, he became a skilled archer living in the wilderness of Paran. Eventually his mother found a wife for Ishmael from her home country, the land of Egypt.

Binding of Isaac

At some point in Isaac's youth, Abraham was commanded by God to offer his son up as a sacrifice in the land of Moriah. The patriarch traveled three days until he came to the mount that God told him of. He then commanded the servants to remain while he and Isaac proceeded alone into the mount. Isaac carried the wood upon which he would be sacrificed. Along the way, Isaac asked his father where the animal for the burnt offering was, to which Abraham replied "God will provide himself a lamb for a burnt offering". Just as Abraham was about to sacrifice his son, he was interrupted by the angel of the Lord, and he saw behind him a "ram caught in a thicket by his horns", which he sacrificed instead of his son. The place was later named as Jehovah-jireh.  For his obedience he received another promise of numerous descendants and abundant prosperity. After this event, Abraham went to Beersheba.

Later years

Sarah died, and Abraham buried her in the Cave of the Patriarchs (the "cave of Machpelah"), near Hebron which he had purchased along with the adjoining field from Ephron the Hittite. After the death of Sarah, Abraham took another wife, a concubine named Keturah, by whom he had six sons: Zimran, Jokshan, Medan, Midian, Ishbak, and Shuah. According to the Bible, reflecting the change of his name to "Abraham" meaning "a father of many nations", Abraham is considered to be the progenitor of many nations mentioned in the Bible, among others the Israelites, Ishmaelites, Edomites, Amalekites, Kenizzites, Midianites and Assyrians, and through his nephew Lot he was also related to the Moabites and Ammonites. Abraham lived to see his son marry Rebekah, and to see the birth of his twin grandsons Jacob and Esau. He died at age 175, and was buried in the cave of Machpelah by his sons Isaac and Ishmael.

Historicity and origins of the narrative

Historicity

He lived in the 3rd or in the 2nd millennium BCE, that mileage varies with a thousand years only counting major archaeologists who believed he existed.

In the early and middle 20th century, leading archaeologists such as William F. Albright and G. Ernest Wright and biblical scholars such as Albrecht Alt and John Bright believed that the patriarchs and matriarchs were either real individuals or believable composites of people who lived in the "patriarchal age", the 2nd millennium BCE. But, in the 1970s, new arguments concerning Israel's past and the biblical texts challenged these views; these arguments can be found in Thomas L. Thompson's The Historicity of the Patriarchal Narratives (1974), and John Van Seters' Abraham in History and Tradition (1975). Thompson, a literary scholar, based his argument on archaeology and ancient texts. His thesis centered on the lack of compelling evidence that the patriarchs lived in the 2nd millennium BCE, and noted how certain biblical texts reflected first millennium conditions and concerns. Van Seters examined the patriarchal stories and argued that their names, social milieu, and messages strongly suggested that they were Iron Age creations. Van Seter and Thompson's works were a paradigm shift in biblical scholarship and archaeology, which gradually led scholars to no longer consider the patriarchal narratives as historical. Some conservative scholars attempted to defend the Patriarchal narratives in the following years, but this has not found acceptance among scholars. By the beginning of the 21st century, archaeologists had given up hope of recovering any context that would make Abraham, Isaac or Jacob credible historical figures.

Origins of the narrative

Abraham's story, like those of the other patriarchs, most likely had a substantial oral prehistory (he is mentioned in the Book of Ezekiel and the Book of Isaiah) and his name is apparently very ancient, as the tradition found in the Book of Genesis no longer understands its original meaning (probably "Father is exalted" – the meaning offered in Genesis 17:5, "Father of a multitude", is a popular etymology). At some stage the oral traditions became part of the written tradition of the Pentateuch; a majority of scholars believe this stage belongs to the Persian period, roughly 520–320 BCE. The mechanisms by which this came about remain unknown, but there are currently two important hypotheses. The first, called Persian Imperial authorisation, is that the post-Exilic community devised the Torah as a legal basis on which to function within the Persian Imperial system; the second is that the Pentateuch was written to provide the criteria for determining who would belong to the post-Exilic Jewish community and to establish the power structures and relative positions of its various groups, notably the priesthood and the lay "elders".

The completion of the Torah and its elevation to the centre of post-Exilic Judaism was as much or more about combining older texts as writing new ones – the final Pentateuch was based on existing traditions. In the Book of Ezekiel, written during the Exile (i.e., in the first half of the 6th century BCE), Ezekiel, an exile in Babylon, tells how those who remained in Judah are claiming ownership of the land based on inheritance from Abraham; but the prophet tells them they have no claim because they do not observe Torah. The Book of Isaiah similarly testifies of tension between the people of Judah and the returning post-Exilic Jews (the "gôlâ"), stating that God is the father of Israel and that Israel's history begins with the Exodus and not with Abraham. The conclusion to be inferred from this and similar evidence (e.g., Ezra–Nehemiah), is that the figure of Abraham must have been preeminent among the great landowners of Judah at the time of the Exile and after, serving to support their claims to the land in opposition to those of the returning exiles.

Religious traditions 

Abraham is given a high position of respect in three major world faiths, Judaism, Christianity and Islam. In Judaism, he is the founding father of the covenant, the special relationship between the Jewish people and God – leading to the belief that the Jews are the chosen people of God. In Christianity, Paul the Apostle taught that Abraham's faith in God – preceding the Mosaic law – made him the prototype of all believers, Jewish or gentile; and in Islam he is seen as a link in the chain of prophets that begins with Adam and culminates in Muhammad.

Judaism
In Jewish tradition, Abraham is called Avraham Avinu (אברהם אבינו), "our father Abraham," signifying that he is both the biological progenitor of the Jews and the father of Judaism, the first Jew. His story is read in the weekly Torah reading portions, predominantly in the parashot: Lech-Lecha (לֶךְ-לְךָ), Vayeira (וַיֵּרָא), Chayei Sarah (חַיֵּי שָׂרָה), and Toledot (תּוֹלְדֹת).

Hanan bar Rava taught in Abba Arikha's name that Abraham's mother was named ʾĂmatlaʾy bat Karnebo. Hiyya bar Abba taught that Abraham worked in Teraḥ's idol shop in his youth.

In Legends of the Jews, God created heaven and earth for the sake of the merits of Abraham. After the biblical flood, Abraham was the only one among the pious who solemnly swore never to forsake God, studied in the house of Noah and Shem to learn about the "Ways of God," continued the line of High Priest from Noah and Shem, and assigning the office to Levi and his seed forever. Before leaving his father's land, Abraham was miraculously saved from the fiery furnace of Nimrod following his brave action of breaking the idols of the Chaldeans into pieces. During his sojourning in Canaan, Abraham was accustomed to extend hospitality to travelers and strangers and taught how to praise God also knowledge of God to those who had received his kindness.

Along with Isaac and Jacob, he is the one whose name would appear united with God, as God in Judaism was called Elohei Abraham, Elohei Yitzchaq ve Elohei Ya'aqob ("God of Abraham, God of Isaac, and God of Jacob") and never the God of anyone else. He was also mentioned as the father of thirty nations.

Abraham is generally credited as the author of the Sefer Yetzirah, one of the earliest extant books on Jewish mysticism.

According to Pirkei Avot, Abraham underwent ten tests at God's command. The Binding of Isaac is specified in the Bible as a test; the other nine are not specified, but later rabbinical sources give various enumerations.

Christianity

In Christianity, Abraham is revered as the prophet to whom God chose to reveal himself and with whom God initiated a covenant (cf. Covenant Theology). Paul the Apostle declared that all who believe in Jesus (Christians) are "included in the seed of Abraham and are inheritors of the promise made to Abraham." In Romans 4, Abraham is praised for his "unwavering faith" in God, which is tied into the concept of partakers of the covenant of grace being those "who demonstrate faith in the saving power of Christ".

Throughout history, church leaders, following Paul, have emphasized Abraham as the spiritual father of all Christians. Augustine of Hippo declared that Christians are "children (or "seed") of Abraham by faith", Ambrose stated that "by means of their faith Christians possess the promises made to Abraham", and Martin Luther recalled Abraham as "a paradigm of the man of faith."

The Roman Catholic Church, the largest Christian denomination, calls Abraham "our father in Faith" in the Eucharistic prayer of the Roman Canon, recited during the Mass. He is also commemorated in the calendars of saints of several denominations: on 20 August by the Maronite Church, 28 August in the Coptic Church and the Assyrian Church of the East (with the full office for the latter), and on 9 October by the Roman Catholic Church and the Lutheran Church–Missouri Synod. In the introduction to his 15th-century translation of the Golden Legend's account of Abraham, William Caxton noted that this patriarch's life was read in church on Quinquagesima Sunday.
He is the patron saint of those in the hospitality industry. The Eastern Orthodox Church commemorates him as the "Righteous Forefather Abraham", with two feast days in its liturgical calendar. The first time is on 9 October (for those churches which follow the traditional Julian Calendar, 9 October falls on 22 October of the modern Gregorian Calendar), where he is commemorated together with his nephew "Righteous Lot". The other is on the "Sunday of the Forefathers" (two Sundays before Christmas), when he is commemorated together with other ancestors of Jesus. Abraham is also mentioned in the Divine Liturgy of Basil the Great, just before the Anaphora, and Abraham and Sarah are invoked in the prayers said by the priest over a newly married couple.

Some Christian theologians equate the "three visitors" with the Holy Trinity, seeing in their apparition a theophany experienced by Abraham (see also the articles on the Constantinian basilica at Mamre and the church at the so-called "Oak of Mamre").

Islam

Islam regards Abraham as a link in the chain of prophets that begins with Adam and culminates in Muhammad.
Ibrāhīm is mentioned in 35 chapters of the Quran, more often than any other biblical personage apart from Moses. He is called both a hanif (monotheist) and muslim (one who submits), and Muslims regard him as a prophet and patriarch, the archetype of the perfect Muslim, and the revered reformer of the Kaaba in Mecca. Islamic traditions consider Ibrāhīm the first Pioneer of Islam (which is also called millat Ibrahim, the "religion of Abraham"), and that his purpose and mission throughout his life was to proclaim the Oneness of God. In Islam, Abraham holds an exalted position among the major prophets and he is referred to as "Ibrahim Khalilullah", meaning "Abraham the Beloved of God".

Besides Ishaq and Yaqub, Ibrahim is among the most honorable and the most excellent men in sight of God. Ibrahim was also mentioned in Quran as "Father of Muslims" and the role model for the community.

Druze
The Druze regard Abraham as the third spokesman (natiq) after Adam and Noah, who helped transmit the foundational teachings of monotheism (tawhid) intended for the larger audience. He is also among the seven prophets who appeared in different periods of history according to the Druze faith.

Mandaeism
In Mandaeism, Abraham is mentioned in Book 18 of the Right Ginza as the patriarch of the Jewish people. Mandaeans consider Abraham to have been originally a Mandaean priest, however they differ with Abraham and Jews regarding circumcision which they consider to be bodily mutilation and therefore forbidden.

In the arts

Painting and sculpture

Paintings on the life of Abraham tend to focus on only a few incidents: the sacrifice of Isaac; meeting Melchizedek; entertaining the three angels; Hagar in the desert; and a few others. Additionally, Martin O'Kane, a professor of Biblical Studies, writes that the parable of Lazarus resting in the "Bosom of Abraham", as described in the Gospel of Luke, became an iconic image in Christian works. According to O'Kane, artists often chose to divert from the common literary portrayal of Lazarus sitting next to Abraham at a banquet in Heaven and instead focus on the "somewhat incongruous notion of Abraham, the most venerated of patriarchs, holding a naked and vulnerable child in his bosom". Several artists have been inspired by the life of Abraham, including Albrecht Dürer (1471–1528), Caravaggio (1573–1610), Donatello, Raphael, Philip van Dyck (Dutch painter, 1680–1753), and Claude Lorrain (French painter, 1600–1682). Rembrandt (Dutch, 1606–1669) created at least seven works on Abraham, Peter Paul Rubens (1577–1640) did several, Marc Chagall did at least five on Abraham, Gustave Doré (French illustrator, 1832–1883) did six, and James Tissot (French painter and illustrator, 1836–1902) did over twenty works on the subject.

The Sarcophagus of Junius Bassus depicts a set of biblical stories, including Abraham about to sacrifice Isaac. These sculpted scenes are on the outside of a marble Early Christian sarcophagus used for the burial of Junius Bassus. He died in 359. This sarcophagus has been described as "probably the single most famous piece of early Christian relief sculpture." The sarcophagus was originally placed in or under Old St. Peter's Basilica, was rediscovered in 1597, and is now below the modern basilica in the Museo Storico del Tesoro della Basilica di San Pietro (Museum of St. Peter's Basilica) in the Vatican. The Old Testament scenes depicted were chosen as precursors of Christ's sacrifice in the New Testament, in an early form of typology. Just to the right of the middle is Daniel in the lion's den and on the left is Abraham about to sacrifice Isaac.

George Segal created figural sculptures by molding plastered gauze strips over live models in his 1987 work Abraham's Farewell to Ishmael. The human condition was central to his concerns, and Segal used the Old Testament as a source for his imagery. This sculpture depicts the dilemma faced by Abraham when Sarah demanded that he expel Hagar and Ishmael. In the sculpture, the father's tenderness, Sarah's rage, and Hagar's resigned acceptance portray a range of human emotions. The sculpture was donated to the Miami Art Museum after the artist's death in 2000.

Christian iconography

Usually Abraham can be identified by the context of the image the meeting with Melchizedek, the three visitors, or the sacrifice of Isaac. In solo portraits a sword or knife may be used as his attribute, as in this statue by Gian Maria Morlaiter or this painting by Lorenzo Monaco. He always wears a gray or white beard.

As early as the beginning of the 3rd century, Christian art followed Christian typology in making the sacrifice of Isaac a foreshadowing of Christ's sacrifice on the cross and its memorial in the sacrifice of the Mass. See for example this 11th-century Christian altar engraved with Abraham's and other sacrifices taken to prefigure that of Christ in the Eucharist.

Some early Christian writers interpreted the three visitors as the triune God. Thus in Santa Maria Maggiore, Rome, a 5th-century mosaic portrays only the visitors against a gold ground and puts semitransparent copies of them in the "heavenly" space above the scene. In Eastern Orthodox art, the visit is the chief means by which the Trinity is pictured (example). Some images do not include Abraham and Sarah, like Andrei Rublev's Trinity, which shows only the three visitors as beardless youths at a table.

Literature
Fear and Trembling (original Danish title: Frygt og Bæven) is an influential philosophical work by Søren Kierkegaard, published in 1843 under the pseudonym Johannes de silentio (John the Silent). Kierkegaard wanted to understand the anxiety that must have been present in Abraham when God asked him to sacrifice his son. W. G. Hardy's novel Father Abraham (1935) tells the fictionalized life story of Abraham.

Music 
In 1681, Marc-Antoine Charpentier released a Dramatic motet (Oratorio), Sacrificim Abrahae H.402 - 402 a - 402 b, for soloists, chorus, doubling instruments and continuo. Sébastien de Brossard released a cantate Abraham (date unknown).

In 1994, Steve Reich released an opera named The Cave. The title refers to the Cave of the Patriarchs. The narrative of the opera is based on the story of Abraham and his immediate family as it is recounted in the various religious texts, and as it is understood by individual people from different cultures and religious traditions.

Bob Dylan's "Highway 61 Revisited" is the title track for his 1965 album Highway 61 Revisited. In 2004, Rolling Stone magazine ranked the song as number 364 in their 500 Greatest Songs of All Time. The song has five stanzas. In each stanza, someone describes an unusual problem that is ultimately resolved on Highway 61. In Stanza 1, God tells Abraham to "kill me a son". God wants the killing done on Highway 61. Abram, the original name of the biblical Abraham, is also the name of Dylan's own father.

See also

Notes

References

Bibliography

External links 

 Abraham smashes the idols (accessed 24 March 2011).
 "Journey and Life of the Patriarch Abraham", a map dating back to 1590.
 Kitáb-i-Íqán

21st-century BC people
 
Angelic visionaries
Biblical patriarchs
Book of Genesis people
Christian saints from the Old Testament
Founders of religions
Hebrew Bible people in Mandaeism
Lech-Lecha
Legendary progenitors
People whose existence is disputed
Prophets in the Druze faith
Ur of the Chaldees
Vayeira
People from Harran
Slave owners